Synophis bicolor, known commonly as the bicolored shadow snake or the two-colored fishing snake, is a species of snake in the family Colubridae. The species is endemic to northwestern South America.

Geographic range
S. bicolor is found in Colombia and Ecuador.

Habitat
The preferred habitats of S. bicolor are lowland rainforest and Andean cloud forest; in both it is found in leaf litter and in bushes.

Behavior
S. bicolor is nocturnal, terrestrial, and semiarboreal.

Description
Dorsally, S. bicolor is uniformly brown, lighter on the sides. Ventrally, it is yellowish white. The upper lip is also yellowish white. The dorsal scales are keeled, in 19 rows at midbody, and without apical pits.

Diet
The diet of S. bicolor is unknown. Even though one of its common names alludes to fishing, there is no evidence that this species eats fish.

Reproduction
S. bicolor is oviparous. Clutch size varies from two to eight eggs.

References

Further reading
Freiberg M (1982). Snakes of South America. Hong Kong: T.F.H. Publications. 189 pp. . (Synophis bicolor, p. 111).
Peracca MG (1896). "Nuovo genero di Colubride aglifo dell'America meridionale ". Bollettino dei Musei di Zoologia ed Anatomia della R[egia]. Università di Torino 11 (266): 1–2. (Synophis bicolor, new species, pp. 1–2). (in Italian).

Reptiles described in 1896
Snakes of South America
Reptiles of Colombia
Reptiles of Ecuador